Bamboos natural hollow form makes it an obvious choice for many musical instruments.

Overview
Bamboo has been used to create a variety of instruments including flutes, mouth organs, saxophones, trumpets, drums, xylophones.

Flutes
There are numerous types of bamboo flutes made all over the world, such as the dizi, xiao, shakuhachi, palendag and jinghu. In the Indian subcontinent, it is a very popular and highly respected musical instrument, available even to the poorest and the choice of many highly venerated maestros of classical music. It is known and revered above all as the divine flute forever associated with Lord Krishna, who is always portrayed holding a bansuri in sculptures and paintings. Four of the instruments used in Polynesia for traditional hula are made of bamboo: nose flute, rattle, stamping pipes and the jaw harp. Bamboo may be used in the construction of the Australian didgeridoo instead of the more traditional eucalyptus wood.

Other bamboo instruments
In Indonesia and the Philippines, bamboo has been used for making various kinds of musical instruments, including the kolintang, angklung and bumbong.
Bamboo is also used to make slit drums.  Traditional Philippine banda kawayan (bamboo bands) use a variety of bamboo musical instruments, including the marimba, angklung, panpipes and bumbong, as well as bamboo versions of western instruments, such as clarinets, saxophones, and tubas. The Las Piñas Bamboo Organ in the Philippines has pipes made of bamboo culms. The modern amplified string instrument, the Chapman stick, is also constructed using bamboo. The khene (also spelled khaen, kaen and khen; Lao: ແຄນ) is a mouth organ of Lao origin whose pipes, which are usually made of bamboo, are connected with a small, hollowed-out hardwood reservoir into which air is blown, creating a sound similar to that of the cello.  In the Indian Ocean island of Madagascar, the valiha, a long tube zither made of a single bamboo stalk, is considered the national instrument.

Bamboo has also recently been used for the manufacture of guitars and ukuleles.  Bamboo Ukuleles are constructed of solid cross laminated bamboo strips not plywood.  The bamboo solid wood strips are similar to bamboo manufactured flooring.

Gallery

References